Sawaab ( /  ; lit: Reward) is a Pakistani Ramadan special drama serial that originally premiered on Hum Sitaray from 18 June – 17 July 2015 and then 7 June – 6 July 2016 simultaneously on its parent channel Hum TV. Noor-ul-Huda Shah served as a showrunner and creator while it is directed by Furqan .T. Siddiqui, with the screenplay written by Ghazala Naqvi and produced by Momina Duraid under her company MD Productions. It stars Sana Nawaz, Abid Ali, Samina Ahmed, Sohail Sameer, Yasra Rizvi and Khalid Malik in pivot roles.

Plot
Nimra is a young housewife, living in a big joint family. Being the only daughter in law, in Ramadan she is struggling hard to make everyone happy by her culinary expertise but dealing with a diplomatic mother in law, cunning elder sister in law and ignorant husband, becomes a tough job and emotional trauma for her. Poor Nimra suffers a lot for her family.

Cast
 Sana Nawaz as Nimra
 Abid Ali as Raziuddin (Nimra's paternal uncle & father-in-law)
 Samina Ahmed as Fehmida (Nimra's mother-in-law)
 Sohail Sameer as Kamal (Nimra's husband)
 Yasra Rizvi as Sadia (Kamal & Nehal's sister)
 Khalid Malik as Kamran (Nimrah's brother & Kamal, Nehal, Rehan, Maria's first mother-side cousin)
 Raima Khan
 Iqra Mughal as Maria (Sadia's sister)
 Zaryan Hasan as Nehal (Kamal's brother)
 Salman Faisal as Rehaan (Kamal's brother)
 Sajwa Binte Shahid

Reception

The drama series garnered numerous praise for its tune of reality and culture and was named highest rated drama series during Ramadan.

See also
 2016 in Pakistani television
 List of programs broadcast by Hum TV

References

External links
 
 

Hum Sitaray
Hum TV
Hum Network Limited
Hum TV original programming
Ramadan special television shows
2016 in Pakistani television
Pakistani drama television series
Pakistani telenovelas
Serial drama television series
MD Productions
Television series by MD Productions
Television series created by Momina Duraid
Urdu-language television shows
2015 Pakistani television series debuts
2015 Pakistani television series endings